The white-bellied woodstar (Chaetocercus mulsant) is a species of hummingbird in tribe Mellisugini of subfamily Trochilinae, the "bee hummingbirds". It is found in Bolivia, Colombia, Ecuador, and Peru.

Taxonomy and systematics

The white-bellied woodstar and several other species in genus Chaetocercus were  formerly placed in genus Acestrura but have been in their current position since the late 20th century. The species is monotypic.

Description

Both sexes have a straightish black bill. The male's upperparts are dark bluish green which continues onto the flanks. A downcurving white line behind the eye meets the white upper breast. Its gorget is iridescent reddish violet. The belly is white as are patches on the flanks. The forked tail is bluish green and its outermost feathers are shafts with no vanes. The female is bronzy green above. It has a grayish "mask" and a buff stripe behind the eye. Its throat is pale cinnamon, the belly white, and the flanks tawny. Its tail is rounded; the central feathers are green and the others cinnamon with a wide black band near the end.

Distribution and habitat

The white-bellied woodstar is found from the Central and Eastern Andes of Colombia south discontinuously through Ecuador and Peru into Bolivia as far as Cochabamba Department. It inhabits the edges of humid forest, pastures, and cultivated areas.

Behavior

Movement

The white-bellied woodstar is mainly sedentary though the records up to 4000 m suggest that it makes seasonal elevational movements.

Feeding

The white-bellied woodstar forages at all levels of vegetation, taking nectar from a variety of flowering plants and trees including Agave, Inga, and Lantana. It also eats small arthropods. It does not defend feeding territories, and because of its small size and slow bumblebee-like flight it is able to feed in the territories of other hummingbirds.

Breeding

Almost nothing is known about the white-bellied woodstar's breeding phenology. One nest was discovered in April in Ecuador; it was about  up in tree.

Vocalization

The white-bellied woodstar's calls include "a rather low-pitched 'djup' note and [a] higher-pitched dull 'chip'."

Status

The IUCN has assessed the white-bellied woodstar as being of Least Concern. It has a large range, and though its population size is not known it is believed to be stable. It is considered uncommon to locally common in various parts of its range and may be more common than thought because it is easy to overlook. It appears to adapt to human-made landscapes.

References

white-bellied woodstar
Birds of the Northern Andes
white-bellied woodstar
white-bellied woodstar
Taxonomy articles created by Polbot